"Dancing Queen" is a 1976 single by Swedish pop group ABBA.

"Dancing Queen" may also refer to:

Music 
 Dancing Queen (album), 2018 Cher album
 "Dancing Queen", a 2012 single by South Korean girl group Crayon Pop
 "Dancing Queen" (Girls' Generation song), a 2012 single by South Korean girl group Girls' Generation

Film 
 Dancing Queen (1993 film), a 1993 British romantic comedy film
 Dancing Queen (2012 film), a 2012 South Korean romantic comedy film

Television 
 Dancing Queen (2008 Indian TV series), a 2008–2009 Indian dance reality competition television series
 Dancing Queen (American TV series), 2018 documentary reality television series on Netflix
 Dancing Queen (2020 Indian TV series), 
 "Dancing Queen" (Legends of Tomorrow), a 2018 episode of Legends of Tomorrow